Oľšavica is a village and obec in Levoča District in the Prešov Region of central-eastern Slovakia.

History
The village was first mentioned in 1300 or 1308. From the village's establishment, villagers have followed the Greek Catholic faith; in 1700 there were 348 Greek Catholics out of 351 people living in the village. It is located in the Slovak Catholic Metropolitan Archeparchy of Prešov. Two natives of the village, brothers Šimon Štefan and Michal Manuel Olšavský, made their hometown famous as bishops of the Greek Catholic Eparchy of Mukachevo in the eighteenth century. In the late nineteenth century, many villagers emigrated to the United States.

In 1944, the village was the site of a mass rescue of some 50 refugees, including 35 Jews who escaped the Holocaust in Slovakia, due to the exhortations of local Slovak Catholic priest Michal Mašlej, who was held in high esteem by the farmers. Preaching that it was their Christian duty to help refugees, Mašlej arranged for persecuted families to hide with various parishioners, and hid the Hartmann family in his personal residence. When German troops had to be quartered in the village, he made sure that they were not placed with any of the families involved in the rescue effort. Mašlej's efforts were supported by his Bishop, Pavel Peter Gojdič. When Mašlej was concerned about the danger to his congregants, Gojdič told him: "The support to the persecuted results of charity and it is your duty according to your capacity to help and to provide shelter to the threatened by deportation". Researcher Nina Paulovičová compared Oľšavica to Nieuwlande and Le Chambon-sur-Lignon—other villages where the population banded together to hide Jews—adding that it was "remarkable" that no one informed on the fugitives and none of them were arrested. Mašlej was recognized as Righteous among the Nations by the Israeli official Holocaust memorial, Yad Vashem, in 1997.

Geography

It is bordered by Brutovce to the east, Tichý Potok to the north, Nižné Repaše to the west, Pavľany to the south, and Poproč to the southeast.

Population 
Its population has decreased from 808 in 1910 to 291 on the 2011 census.

Landmarks and tourist attraction
The church in the village was built in 1861 and is consecrated to Our Lady of Protection.

References

Villages and municipalities in Levoča District
The Holocaust in Slovakia
Rescue of Jews during the Holocaust